The Oshkosh M911 (factory designation F2365) is a heavy-load truck produced by the Oshkosh Corporation in the 1970s, used by the US Army.

History
In the second half of the 1970s, the US Army procured 1,000 of the heavy-haul truck – together with the four-axle M747 semitrailer – for road transportation of main battle tanks and other heavy loads. A tank often carried by the Oshkosh M911 was the M47 Patton. The Oshkosh M911 was also used with the US Army units stationed in Europe.
The Oshkosh M911 has a crew of three, weighs 18.2 tons, and has a payload capacity of 68.95 tons. The Oshkosh M911 has a Detroit 8V92TA turbocharged 12-liter Diesel V-8 engine that produces 435 horsepower.

An Oshkosh M911 was exhibited at the Swiss Military Museum Full.

Operators

References

External links

 Oshkoshtruck home page
 Schweizerisches Militärmuseum Full

Military trucks of the United States
Off-road vehicles
Military vehicles introduced in the 1970s